Two American football franchises have been referred to as the Rhein Fire:

 Rhein Fire (NFL Europe), active in NFL Europe between 1995 and 2007;
 Rhein Fire (ELF), active in the European League of Football since 2021.